Yeo Ui-son was a Korean civil minister (munsin) and diplomat from the Hamyang Yeo clan during the early period of the Joseon dynasty. Yeo served as the first governor (moksa) of the Jeju Island and a Jeonseo (minister). He also was sent to Japan as a diplomat representing Joseon.

Biography
On October 25, 1403, the fourth year of Taejong's reign, Yeo Ui-son was dispatched to Japan as a return courtesy to an earlier Japanese diplomatic mission to Korea sent from the Japanese shogun, Ashikaga Yoshimochi in the same year. He was a Joseonseo (典書), the predecessor of Panseo, or, minister of Yukjo, the Six Ministries.

On February 27, 1406, however, the king banished Yeo to Jindo island for his remissness in the discharge of his duty as a diplomat. When Yeo Ui-son arrived in Japan, a diplomat from Ming China also visited there. His interpreter, Hwang Gi (黃奇) was fluent in both Chinese and Japanese language, so the Ming diplomat took off Hwang to China. In addition, Yeo did not submit a report regarding the news to the king that Ming informed Japan of the intention to assault Joseon, but spread it in private. The Office of Inspector-General called Saheonbu  accused Yeo of the negligence of the mission.

See also
 Joseon diplomacy
 Joseon missions to Japan
 Joseon Tongsinsa

Notes

References

 Daehwan, Noh.  "The Eclectic Development of Neo-Confucianism and Statecraft from the 18th to the 19th Century," Korea Journal (Winter 2003).
 Hall, John Whitney. (1997). The Cambridge History of Japan: Early Modern Japan. Cambridge: Cambridge University Press. ; 
 Kang, Etsuko Hae-jin. (1997). Diplomacy and Ideology in Japanese-Korean Relations: from the Fifteenth to the Eighteenth Century. 	Basingstoke, Hampshire; Macmillan. ;

External links
 Joseon Tongsinsa Cultural Exchange Association ; 

Year of birth unknown
Year of death unknown
Joseon dynasty
Korean diplomats
Hamyang Yeo clan